Dominique de La Rochefoucauld (Saint-Ilpize, Haute-Loire, 26 September 1712 – Münster, Germany, 23 September 1800) was a French bishop and cardinal.

Life

Before the French Revolution 

He was from an impoverished branch of the La Rochefoucauld family. He became archbishop of Albi in 1747, and archbishop of Rouen in 1759.

Under the Revolution 

The clergy of Rouen sent him as their deputy to the États généraux of 1789. As President of the chamber of clergy, he refused its union with the Third Estate. He had to submit, given a direct order from Louis XVI. In protest he submitted a list of clerical rights.

He led a fierce opposition to the Constitution, and signed the protest of 12 September 1791. After 10 August 1792 he went into exile, in Germany from 1794. 

He joined the Société des amis des noirs.

Notes

Bibliography

External links
"(20) 2. LA ROCHEFOUCAULD, Dominique de (1712-1800)", The Cardinals of the Holy Roman Church
 "Monseigneur de la Rochefoucault – Thérèse Eude (séance du 21 octobre 1992)", Groupe Histoire des Hôpitaux de Rouen

1712 births
1800 deaths
Archbishops of Albi
Archbishops of Rouen
18th-century French cardinals
Cardinals created by Pope Pius VI